The Ministry of Justice and Human Rights of Chad is structured in the following manner:

 Cabinet Office
 General Inspection
 Central Administration
 Judicial services
 Joint regional delegations
 Organizations under guardianship

In keeping with the overseeing of human rights, the ministry manages the following judicial services:

 Court of Appeal
 Courts of the Grand Instances
 Labor Courts
 Courts of Commerce
 Justice of the peace

List of ministers (Post-1960 upon achieving independence) 

François Tombalbaye (1961-1962)
Ali Kosso (1962-1963)
Joseph Brahim Seid (1966-1975)
 Nathe Amady (1975-1977)
 Mahamoud Abderaman (1977-1978)
 Abderaman Moussa (1979)
Simon Narcisse Bozanga (1980)
 Djona Golo (1980-1981)
Delwa Kassiré Koumakoye (1981-1982)
 Oudalbaye Naham (1983-1984)
 Routouang Golom Yoma (1985-1986)
Djibril Negue Djogo (1987-1988)
Delwa Kassiré Koumakoye (1989)
Wadal Abdel Kader Kamougue (1990)
Mallah Abakar (1991) [referred to as the Commissioner of Justice]
Youssouf Togoumi (1992-1993)
Delwa Kassiré Koumakoye (1993)
Loum Hinaisou Laina (1994-1995)
Maldoum Bada Abbas (1996)
Abdelkarim Nadjo (1997)
Nadjita Beassoumal (1998)
Limane Mahamat (1999-2000)
Mahamat Ahamat Ahlhabo (2001)
Mahamat Abdoulaye (2002)
Djimnaye Koudji Gaou (2003-2005)
Albert Pahimi Padacké (2007-2008)
Jean Alingué Bawoyeu (2008-2010)
M'bailao Naimbaye Lossimian (2010-2013)
Bechir Madet (2014-2017) [referred to as Minister of Justice and Human Rights]
Ahmat Mahamat Hassan (2017)
Djimet Arabi (2017–present)

See also 

 Justice ministry
 Politics of Chad

References 

Justice ministries
Government of Chad